The Minaret Formation is a Late Cambrian limestone formation of the Heritage Group of Antarctica. The age of the formation is established to be Guzhangian to Cambrian Stage 10 (or Merioneth to Dresbachian in the regional stratigraphy), dated at ranging from 500 to 488 Ma.

The formation has provided the first known Late Cambrian archaeocyathid, and Knightoconus antarcticus, an ancestor to the cephalopods.

Description 
The Minaret Formation forms a discontinuous limestone unit exposed from Webers Peaks in the northern Heritage Range to the Independence Hills in Horseshoe Valley of the Ellsworth Mountains. At Mount Rosenthal, at the head of Horseshoe Valley, the Minaret Formation is formed predominantly of white to pale grey micritic limestone with thin, discrete interbeds of oolitic and oncolithic grainstones.

The Minaret Formation is the uppermost formation of the Heritage Group, overlying the Liberty Hills and Springer Peak Formations. The formation is overlain by the Howard Nunataks Formation of the Crashsite Group. The formation ranges from shallow to deep marine. The Minaret fauna contains the first known Late Cambrian archaeocyathid. During the final stages of Gondwanian deformation, structureless and stratified post-cleavage breccia bodies formed in the carbonate lithologies of the Minaret Formation, due to cave-like dissolution processes and contemporaneous low temperature hydrothermal activity.

Fossil content 
The reefal limestones of the formation have provided fossils:
 Antarcticocyathus webersi
 Gastropods
 Strepsodiscus splettstoesseri
 Conodonts
 Furnishina furnishi
 F. quadrata
 F. ?asymmetrica
 Proacodus tenuis
 Phakelodus sp.
 Westergaardodina bicuspidata
 W. moessebergensis
 W. tricuspidata
 Tergomya
 Aremellia batteni
 Ellsworthoconus andersoni
 Kirengella pyramidalis
 Knightoconus antarcticus
 Proconus incertis
 Proplina rutfordi
 Rostroconchia
 Apoptopegma craddocki
 Cosminoconella runnegari
 Paragastropoda
 Matherella antarctica
 Ribeiria australiensis
 Scaevogyra thompsoni
 ?Kobayashiella heritagensis

See also 
 List of fossiliferous stratigraphic units in Antarctica
 Geology of Antarctica
 Shackleton Limestone, Cambrian fossiliferous limestone of Antarctica

References

Bibliography 

 
 
 
 
 
  

Geologic formations of Antarctica
Paleozoic Antarctica
Furongian
Guzhangian
Limestone formations
Shallow marine deposits
Deep marine deposits
Cambrian southern paleotemperate deposits
Paleontology in Antarctica